Jean-Marie Cadieu (born 16 October 1963 in Tulle) is a former French rugby union player. He played as a lock.

Cadieu played for Stade Toulousain from 1982/83 to 1992/93, where he won 3 titles of the French Championship, in 1984/85, 1985/86 and 1988/89, and a Cup of France, in 1983/84. He then moved to RC Narbonne, where he developed from 1993/94 to 2005/06, when he finished his career.

Cadieu had 12 caps for France, from 1991 to 1992, scoring 1 try, 4 points in aggregate. He played 4 games at the 1991 Rugby World Cup. He had 2 matches at the Five Nations Championship in 1992.

External links
Jean-Marie Cadieu International Statistics

1963 births
Living people
People from Tulle
French rugby union players
Rugby union locks
France international rugby union players
Stade Toulousain players
Sportspeople from Corrèze
RC Narbonne players